Ceralocyna nigricollis (big suzie beetle) is a species of beetle in the family Cerambycidae. It was described by Ratcliffe in 1911  but was in fact discovered by Joshua Knight the year before in 1910.

References

Ceralocyna
Beetles described in 1911